Philanthus crabroniformis is a species of bee-hunting wasp (or "beewolf") of North America. The species primarily preys upon Halictidae. They nest in sandy soils.

References

Crabronidae
Hymenoptera of North America
Insects described in 1856